The 2011 Australian Football League finals series determined the winner of the 2011 AFL season. The series was scheduled to occur over four weekends in September 2011, culminating with the 115th AFL/VFL Grand Final at the Melbourne Cricket Ground on 1 October 2011. Traditionally held on the final Saturday in September, the grand final date was pushed to October to accommodate two extra rounds in the home and away season.

The finals system 

The system is a final eight system. This system is different from the McIntyre final eight system, which was previously used by the AFL, and was used by the National Rugby League in 2011.

The top four teams in the eight receive what is popularly known as the "double chance" when they play in week-one qualifying finals. This means that even if a top-four team loses in the first week, it still remains in the finals, playing a semi-final the next week against the winner of an elimination final. The bottom four of the eight play knock-out games, in that only the winners survive and move on to the next week. Home-state advantage goes to the team with the higher seed in the first two weeks, to the qualifying final winners in the third week. Games in Victoria are played at the MCG, regardless of the team's usual home ground, if a crowd larger than the seating capacity of Etihad Stadium (53,359) is expected.

In the second week, the winners of the qualifying finals receive a bye to the third week. The losers of the qualifying final plays the elimination finals winners in a semi-final. In the third week, the winners of the semi-finals from week two play the winners of the qualifying finals in the first week. The winners of those matches move on to the Grand Final at the MCG in Melbourne.

Qualification

Summary of results

Week one (qualifying & elimination finals) 
For the first time since the current AFL finals system was introduced in 2000, all four finals were played in Melbourne in the first week of the finals.

First qualifying final (Collingwood vs. West Coast)

Second qualifying final (Geelong vs. Hawthorn)

First elimination final (Carlton vs. Essendon)

Second elimination final (St Kilda vs. Sydney)

Week two (semi-finals)

First semi-final (West Coast vs. Carlton)

Second semi-final (Hawthorn vs. Sydney)

Week three (preliminary finals)

First preliminary final (Collingwood vs. Hawthorn)

Second preliminary final (Geelong vs. West Coast)

Week four (Grand Final)

Notes and references

External links 
 AFL official website
 RealFooty by The Age (Melbourne) Online 
 SportsAustralia (news and views)

Finals Series, 2011